The list of shipwrecks in 1779 includes some ships sunk, wrecked or otherwise lost during 1779.

January

20 January

25 January

Unknown date

February

12 February

28 February

Unknown date

March

8 March

12 March

14 March

16 March

19 March

22 March

23 March

24 March

25 March

26 March

Unknown date

April

7 April

8 April

9 April

12 April

18 April

25 April

29 April

Unknown date

May

2 May

21 May

Unknown date

June

26 June

Unknown date

July

24 July

August

14 August

16 August

19 August

29 August

29 August

Unknown date

Unknown date

September

5 September

8 September

15 September

19 September

23 September

25 September

Unknown date

October

6 October

15 October

29 October

30 October

Unknown date

November

1 November

3 November

9 November

10 November

13 November

16 November

20 November

25 November

26 November

Unknown date

December

2 December

3 December

10 December

11 December

16 December

25 December

27 December

28 December

Unknown date

Unknown date

References

1779